Way Out West are an Australian jazz group, formed in 2001. They originated in the western suburbs of Melbourne and are noted for their unusual instrumentation which includes West African drumming, and many traditional Vietnamese string instruments such as a dan tranh, dan nguyet and dan bau.

The band has performed at major international festivals such as the Montreal Jazz Festival, Vancouver Jazz Festival, and Veneto Jazz Festival.

Reception
Their second album, Old Grooves for New Streets (2007), received five star reviews in Australia, and a review by America's All About Jazz said, "Certainly a candidate for Best Release of the Year – I hope lots of ears hear this one!". In 2009 the group won the Bell Award for Australian Jazz Ensemble of the year. 
The Sydney Morning Herald observed, "That these exotic sounds blend so well with jazz is a mysterious Melbourne alchemy".

Discography

Albums

Awards and nominations

AIR Awards
The Australian Independent Record Awards (commonly known informally as AIR Awards) is an annual awards night to recognise, promote and celebrate the success of Australia's Independent Music sector.

|-
| AIR Awards of 2010
|The Effects of the Weather 
| Best Independent Jazz Album
| 
|-

See also
 Peter Knight (musician)

References

External links
Jazz Head.com

Australian jazz ensembles
Musicians from Melbourne